Bruce Carlton Bolling (April 29, 1945September 11, 2012) was a politician and businessman in  Boston, Massachusetts. He was a member of the Boston City Council and served as the council's first black president in the mid-1980s. He unsuccessfully ran for mayor of Boston in 1993.

Early years
Bolling was educated at Boston English High School, Northeastern University, and 
received a master's degree in education from Antioch University (now Cambridge College). He was from "the city's most politically successful black family. His father, Royal L. Bolling, was a state senator and his brother, Royal L. Bolling Jr., served as state representative."

Political career
Around 1980, Bolling worked "in the administration of Mayor Kevin White in a variety of capacities, including positions in the Office of Public Safety and as a manager of a Little City Hall." In November 1981, he was elected to the Boston City Council, in the final election when all seats were at-large. He was subsequently re-elected to four two-year terms as the representative for District 7 (Roxbury). He was council president in 1986 and 1987 — "the first Black elected president of the Boston City Council." He lost his position on the council following the November 1991 election, when he unsuccessfully sought an at-large seat. He returned to the council in September 1992, following the death of at-large member Christopher A. Iannella, as Bolling had finished fifth in the election for four at-large seats. Bolling ran for Mayor of Boston in 1993, finishing fifth in the preliminary election.

Later years and legacy
From 2000 until his death, Bolling was director of MassAlliance, a firm specializing in small business development. He died of prostate cancer on September 11, 2012. He was 67.

In 2015, the Ferdinand Building in then-Dudley Square (now Nubian Square) was renamed the Bruce C. Bolling Municipal Building in his honor. The dedication ceremony was attended by his brother, Royal L. Bolling, Jr., Massachusetts Governor Charlie Baker, Boston Mayor Marty Walsh, and other Massachusetts politicians.

References

Further reading
Publications by Bolling
 
 
 
Publications about Bolling
 
  (Controversy over taxi driver refusing to drive black City Councilman Bruce Bolling home to Roxbury neighborhood).

External links
 Bolling profile at bostonlocaltv.org
 Bolling election records at ourcampaigns.com
 Community, Officials Honor Legacy of Bruce Bolling via YouTube
 Bruce C. Bolling Building Renaming Ceremony at cityofboston.gov (April 7, 2015)
 

Boston City Council members
Businesspeople from Boston
20th century in Boston
1945 births
2012 deaths
Deaths from prostate cancer
Deaths from cancer in Massachusetts
Cambridge College alumni
African-American city council members in Massachusetts
20th-century American businesspeople
20th-century African-American people
21st-century African-American people